Eades may refer to:

 6191 Eades, main-belt asteroid
 Eades, Ontario, Canada
 Eades (surname)
 Michael Eades Reserve, Australia